was a town located in Ena District, Gifu Prefecture, Japan.

As of 2003, the town had an estimated population of 2,563 and a density of 19.57 persons per km². The total area was 130.96 km².

On October 25, 2004, Kamiyahagi, along with the towns of Akechi, Iwamura and Yamaoka, and the village of Kushihara (all from Ena District), was merged into the expanded city of Ena, and no longer exists as an independent municipality.

Notes

External links
 Official website of Ena 

Dissolved municipalities of Gifu Prefecture
Populated places disestablished in 2004
Ena, Gifu

2004 disestablishments in Japan